Dick Clayton may refer to:

Dick Clayton, character in Worst Week played by Kurtwood Smith
Dick Clayton, 1958 winner of the Purdue Grand Prix
Dick Clayton, radio host of WIP-AM

See also
Richard Clayton (disambiguation)